Per Jimmie Åkesson (born 17 May 1979) is a Swedish politician and author, serving as leader of the Sweden Democrats since 2005. He has been a member of the Riksdag (SD) for Jönköping County since 2010. He previously served as leader of the Sweden Democratic Youth from 2000 until 2005.

Early life
Jimmie Åkesson was born in Ivetofta in Skåne County, but grew up in Sölvesborg in Blekinge County. His father Stefan is a businessman who ran a floor laying business and his mother Britt Marie was a care provider in a nursing home. Åkesson's parents divorced when he was young and he was raised primarily by his mother.

Åkesson studied political science, law, economics, human geography and philosophy at Lund University and has stated that he became interested in politics around this time. Prior to working full-time in politics, Åkesson worked as a web developer and founded a web design company BMJ Aktiv with Björn Söder, the former party secretary of the Sweden Democrats.

Political career

Youth politics
Åkesson was a member of the Moderate Youth League, the youth wing of the Moderate Party, but left the Moderates to join the original version of Sweden Democratic Youth Association (the youth wing of the Sweden Democrats) in 1995, although some sources state 1994. In his autobiography, Åkesson wrote that he decided to become a member the SD on New Year's Eve in 1994 but did not formally sign membership papers until the new year and did not want to join while the party's first chairman Anders Klarström was in charge due to considering him too radical. In interviews, Åkesson has claimed that he joined the SD after many of the party's original and more hardline members had left. In an article for the SDU's magazine in 1997, Åkesson wrote "We had the first contact with SD sometime in December of the same year [1994], and during a meeting at New Year's Eve we decided to start working party politically, and that a local SDU branch would eventually be formed." Journalist and former SD press secretary Christian Krappedal corroborated that Åkesson became a member of the party in the spring of 1995.

In 1995, he also co-founded a local chapter of the Sweden Democratic Youth Association. In 1997, he was elected as a deputy member of the party board. The SD's policies that he claims he was most attracted to at first were its view on the European Union, and its policy on immigration.

In the 1998 Swedish general election, at the age of 19, Åkesson was elected to public office as a councilman in Sölvesborg Municipality. The same year, he also became deputy chairman of the newly established Sweden Democratic Youth (Sverigedemokratisk Ungdom), and later, from 2000 to 2005, was chairman of the organisation.

2005–present: Party leader

In 2005, he defeated party leader Mikael Jansson in a party election to become the party leader of the Sweden Democrats (SD). During his chairmanship of the youth league and as party leader, Åkesson has been described and has presented himself as part of a driving force to moderate the SD's policies and image. Along with Björn Söder, Richard Jomshof and Mattias Karlsson, Åkesson was considered part of the "Scania Gang" or "Fantastic Four" within the SD; a political clique of younger members who sought to moderate and reform the party.

In the 2010 Swedish general election, the SD for the first time crossed the election threshold and entered the Riksdag, with 5.70% of the votes, gaining 20 seats. Åkesson, who was placed first on the party's national ballot, was elected as a Member of the Riksdag (MP) along with 19 of his fellow party members.

In September 2014, Sveriges Radio (SR) reported that Åkesson had spent upwards of 500,000 kronor ($70,000) in 2014 alone on online betting. The sum is more than the politician would have earned all year, after tax, reported SR. The revelation caused an uproar, both among people who view Åkesson as unreliable and those who opposed SR's decision to publish the information. Among the latter were former Green Party Spokesperson Maria Wetterstrand and Foreign Minister Carl Bildt. Åkesson himself called SR's actions an attempt at character assassination.

Following the 2010 Swedish general election, Åkesson announced he would be on sick leave due to burnout. In early 2015, Åkesson was named Sweden's most important opinion leader for the calendar year 2014 by the Swedish magazine DSM in their annual rankings.

On 27 March 2015, Åkesson publicly announced that he would return to his duties as party leader for the SD, albeit initially in a somewhat reduced role, on the SVT program Skavlan, as well as in an open letter on his Facebook page.

In the 2018 Swedish general election, the SD got 17.6% of the votes (+4.7 pp), after the Swedish Social Democratic Party (28.4%, -2.6 pp) and the Moderate Party (19.8%, -3.5 pp). SD had 62 of 349 seats in the next Riksdag.

The SD saw a greater rise in support during the 2022 Swedish general election under Åkesson's leadership with the party overtaking the Moderates to become the second largest in the Riksdag.

Personal life
Åkesson was engaged to Louise Erixon, a former parliamentary aid to Björn Söder and the daughter of former Sweden Democrats MP Margareta Gunsdotter. Erixon is currently the mayor of Sölvesborg, and one of the first Sweden Democrats to hold a local mayorship. They have a son, born in 2013.

On 24 April 2020, Erixon announced on her Facebook page that the couple had separated some time previously.

Outside of politics, Åkesson is also a musician and plays keyboard for the rock group Bedårande Barn alongside Peter London. Åkesson currently resides in Sölvesborg. According to his personal profile, his main interests are playing golf and watching football. He is a supporter of Mjällby AIF.

Bibliography 
 (2008): 20 röster om 20 år. Sverigedemokraterna 1988–2008 
 (2009): Åkesson om... Vecka 40–52 2008  
 (2013): Satis polito. 
 (2018): Det moderna folkhemmet.

References

External links 

  
 Jimmie Åkesson at the Sweden Democrats' website 
 Jimmie Åkesson's political blog 
 Jimmie Åkesson at the Swedish parliament's website 

1979 births
Living people
Leaders of political parties in Sweden
Swedish bloggers
Lund University alumni
People from Bromölla Municipality
People from Sölvesborg Municipality
People from Blekinge
Members of the Riksdag 2010–2014
Members of the Riksdag 2014–2018
Members of the Riksdag 2018–2022
Members of the Riksdag 2022–2026
Members of the Riksdag from the Sweden Democrats
21st-century Swedish politicians
Opposition leaders